The Corpus Christi Catholic Church is located at Celebration, Florida, a master-planned community in Osceola County, Florida, United States, near Walt Disney World Resort. The Church is part of the Orlando Diocese of Florida, as created by the Vatican.  The parish population was made up of around 100 families at the start of the community in 2005, but as of 2017 is estimated to be more than 1,000 families.

Church services in the area were first held at the Celebration K8 School and then later in the Celebration High School cafeteria. The church was designed by Cooper Johnson Smith Architects & Town Planners. Groundbreaking for the church was held in November 2008, though construction (by general contractor Brasfield & Gorrie) did not begin in earnest until the following January. Pastor Gregory Parkes was able to celebrate the first Mass in the new building on the morning of December 24.

Construction of the new church was completed on December 24, 2009.  The church was dedicated on Saturday, January 16, 2010 with Bishop Thomas Wenski of the Orlando Diocese presiding.

Today the church is led by Fr. Richard W. Trout, Jr., Pastor.

References

External links 
 Corpus Christi Catholic Church of Celebration Florida website 
 Orlando Diocese website
 Vatican website

Churches in Osceola County, Florida
Roman Catholic churches in Florida
Roman Catholic churches completed in 2009
2004 establishments in Florida
Celebration, Florida
New Classical architecture
21st-century Roman Catholic church buildings in the United States